The  was an event established by Kobe in 1996 to promote anime and other visual media. The  were given annually until 2015 by Kobe and the Organising Committee to creators and creations.

Event
Animation Kobe has been held annually in Kobe since 1996. In addition to the awards ceremony, the event holds screenings of the prize winners and talk shows. The 11th event, in 2006, was carried live on the official website. The awards event was closed in 2015.

Major staff
 Chairman of the Committee
 Yasuki Hamano, 1996–2005
 Akira Kamiya, 2006–2015

 Chairman of the examination
The examination is done mainly by a panel of chief editors of the magazines covering anime, such as Newtype, Animedia and Animage.  Usually, one of the city employees sent by Kobe City also participates. The panel vote for one of its members to serve as chairman:
 Nobuo Oda, 1998 – chief editor of Animedia
 Susumu Asaka, 1999 – chief editor of CD-ROM Fan
 Toshihiro Fukuoka, 2000 – chief editor of Weekly Ascii
 Masahito Arinaga, 2001 – chief editor of a new magazine of MediaWorks
 Akitaro Daichi, 2002–2003 – animation director
 Kenji Yano, 2004 – chief editor of Newtype
 Yasushi Nakaji, 2006 – chief editor of Animedia
 Toshihiro Fukuoka, 2007 – chief editor of Weekly Ascii
 Isao Fujioka, 2008 – chairman of MdN Corporation

Winners
The committee chooses most of the winners. Only the Animation Kobe Theme Song Award is chosen by fans' votes in the first selection, though the decision is by the committee. Therefore, the tendency of the prize winners is a little different from other 
prizes by the fans' vote. (See: Animage Grand Prix)

Individual Award
The activities from September of the previous year to August of the event year become objects for the examination. Newcomers expected to have future prominence are noted.

* Watanabe, Okiura, Nagahama, Iso and Katō received the award for their first films as director.

Special Award
Awards for individual(s) or group that contributed to Japanese anime during a long period.

In the first year, the Yomiuri Award was posthumously given to Fujiko F. Fujio who died two months before the event.

Theatrical Film Award
Animation films released in Japan from September of the previous year to August of the event year become candidates. The candidates are selected not only from Japan, but also from other countries. However, the committee sees more importance in a point of view promoting young creators of Japan.

Television Award
The TV animations broadcast in Japan from September of the previous year to August of the event year, excluding rebroadcasts, become candidates. The candidates are selected not only from Japan but also from other countries. However, the committee sees more importance in a point of view promoting young creators of Japan.

Packaged Work Award
The packaged media distributed in Japan from September of the previous year to August of the event year become candidates. The candidates are selected not only from Japan but also from other countries. However, the committee sees more importance in a point of view promoting young creators of Japan.

Network Award
Re-created in 2000 as Network Media Award, the anime-related media making the best use of interactive distribution in Japan from September of the previous year to August of the event year become candidates.

The word Network does not mean only Internet. The candidates are selected not only from Japan but also from other countries. However, the committee sees more importance in a point of view promoting young creators of Japan.

Theme Song Award
The theme songs of either anime or other forms of animated media distributed in Japan from September of the previous year to August of the event year become candidates. The voting by fans is counted, and the five songs with the highest number of votes become the candidates for the final competition. Especially, the committee sees more importance in original songs made for an anime, sung in the 'spirit' of the work.

Only the Thema Song Award is influenced by the fans. This format started from the 4th event. The total number of votes in a year is about 10,000 votes. The result of the vote is also announced on the official sites of Radio Kansai, Anitama.com and the programs of Radio Kansai before the event. Though this is a preliminary vote to reduce the candidates to final,  the candidates chosen in first by the vote have always won the award.

See also

 List of animation awards
 Lists of animated feature films
 BAFTA Award for Best Animated Film
 Annie Award for Best Animated Feature
 Golden Globe Award for Best Animated Feature Film
 Critics' Choice Movie Award for Best Animated Feature
 Annie Award for Best Animated Feature — Independent
 Saturn Award for Best Animated Film
 Japan Media Arts Festival
 Tokyo Anime Award

References

External links 

  

Events in Kobe
Anime awards
Tourist attractions in Kobe
1996 establishments in Japan
2015 disestablishments in Japan
Recurring events established in 1996
Recurring events disestablished in 2015
Annual events in Japan
Awards established in 1996
Awards disestablished in 2015
Animation awards